Andranoboka is a town and commune in Madagascar. It belongs to the district of Mahajanga II, which is a part of Boeny Region. The population of the commune was estimated to be approximately 4,000 in the 2001 commune census.

Andranoboka is served by a local airport and by riverine harbour. Only primary schooling is available. A majority of 50% of the population work in fishing while 48.5% are farmers.  The most important crops are rice and sugarcane, while other important agricultural products are bananas and cassava.  Services provide employment for 1.5% of the population.

References and notes 

Populated places in Boeny